Peeple may refer to:

 Peeple (company), an Austin, Texas-based company and their internet-based peephole product of the same name
 Peeple (mobile application), a mobile application that allows people to rate other people

See also
 Peeples, an American surname
 People